Sari Dasht-e Naz International Airport  is located in Sari, in Central District of Mazandaran Province, Iran. It was established in 1947.

Airlines and destinations

References 

Airports in Iran
Buildings and structures in Mazandaran Province
Transportation in Mazandaran Province